Carlos Martínez may refer to:

People

Arts and entertainment
 Carlos Martínez (actor) (born 1955), Spanish actor
 Carlos Martínez Aguirre (born 1974), Spanish poet
 Carlos Martínez Baena (1889–1971), Spanish-Mexican actor
 Carlos Martínez Rivas (1924–1998), Nicaraguan poet

Politicians
 Carlos Martínez Alonso (born 1950), Spanish politician
 Carlos Martínez de Irujo, 1st Marquess of Casa Irujo (1763–1864),  Spanish prime minister (1823–1824) and diplomat
 Carlos Martínez de Irujo, 2nd Marquess of Casa Irujo (1802–1855), Spanish politician and prime minister (1847)
 Carlos Martínez Martínez (born 1964), Mexican politician
 Carlos Méndez Martínez (born 1943), Puerto Rican politician
 Carlos Walker Martínez (1842–1905), Chilean lawyer, politician and poet
 José Carlos Martínez (politician) (1962–2011),  Argentine politician

Sportspeople

Baseball players
 Carlos Martínez (infielder) (1965–2006), Venezuelan baseball player
 Carlos Martínez (pitcher, born 1982), Dominican baseball player for the Florida Marlins
 Carlos Martínez (pitcher, born 1991), Dominican baseball player for the St. Louis Cardinals

Footballers
 Carlos Martínez (footballer, born 1980), Spanish football left winger
 Carlos Martínez (footballer, born April 1986), Spanish football rightback
 Carlos Martínez (footballer, born June 1986), Spanish football striker
 Carlos Martínez (footballer, born February 1989), Spanish football winger
 Carlos Martínez (footballer, born August 1989), Spanish football midfielder
 Carlos Martinez (soccer, born 1992), American soccer midfielder
 Carlos Martínez (footballer, born 1997), Spanish football forward
 Carlos Martínez (footballer, born 1999), Costa Rican football defender
 Carlos Martínez (Uruguayan footballer) (1940–2015), Uruguayan footballer
 Carlos Martínez Arribas (born 1988), known as Carletes, Spanish football forward
 Carlos Julio Martínez (born 1994), Dominican international football rightback
 Juan Carlos Martínez Camarena (born 1991), Mexican football forward

Other sports
 Carlos Martínez (American football) (born 1980), American gridiron football kicker
 Carlos Martínez (sprinter) (born 1945), Cuban Olympic sprinter
 Carlos Martínez (boxer) (born 1978), Mexican boxer
 Carlos Alberto Martínez (born 1957), Argentine Olympic skier

Other fields
 Carlos Martínez Gorriarán (born 1959), Spanish scholar
 Carlos Martínez Shaw (born 1945), Spanish historian

Places
 Capitán FAP Carlos Martínez de Pinillos International Airport, in Trujillo, Peru
 Polideportivo Carlos Martínez Balmori, indoor arena in Mineral de la Reforma, Mexico

See also 
 Carles Martínez (born 1988), Spanish football midfielder
 
 Martínez (surname)